Elise Jones (born August 23, 1997), known professionally as Chloe Cherry, is an American actress, model, and former pornographic actress. She started her pornographic career in 2015 with Hussie Models, eventually appearing in over 200 films. She made her acting debut as Faye on the HBO teen drama television series Euphoria (2022–present).

Early life
Elise Jones was born on August 23, 1997 in Willow Street, Pennsylvania, where she was also raised, describing her upbringing as "very conservative and boring". Cherry's father was diagnosed with cancer when she was seven years old and died the following year. In high school, she worked on her school's yearbook, read morning announcements, and briefly managed a band, though she has stated that she was a "terrible" student and got poor grades. According to her, she was frequently bullied by other students for not attending church and was "obsessed with sex" in her late teens.

Career
In 2015, one week after Cherry turned 18 years old, she moved from Pennsylvania to Miami to become a pornographic actress. She was soon signed to pornographic modeling agency Hussie Models, where she was represented by Riley Reynolds, before moving to Los Angeles and signing with Spiegler Girls. By 2019, she had starred in over 200 pornographic films and became popular on Pornhub, where her films received over 125 million views. Early on during the COVID-19 pandemic, she began primarily using OnlyFans to sell pornographic content.

In 2022, Cherry made her acting debut on the second season of the HBO teen drama television series Euphoria in the recurring role of Faye, a drug dealer's girlfriend. Prior to appearing on the show, Cherry made a pornographic parody of Euphoria, in which she played Jules, with fellow pornographic actress Jenna Foxx. Euphorias showrunner, Sam Levinson, later sent Cherry an email asking her to audition for the role of Ami, a stripper and drug addict, after becoming a fan of hers on Instagram due to her sense of humor. After two virtual auditions, Cherry auditioned in person for Levinson in Los Angeles and was given the part of Faye instead. Cherry was called one of the breakout stars of the show by critics. She soon retired from pornographic acting to pursue screen acting full-time.

In January 2022, Cherry signed a contract with British modeling agency Anti-Agency London. She made her runway debut in February 2022, walking for LaQuan Smith during New York Fashion Week.  In March 2022, she announced she was done with the porn industry.  Cherry will star in the science fiction drama film www.RachelOrmont.com, written and directed by Peter Vack, and the comedy-drama film Tuna Melt, written and directed by Eddie Huang.

Personal life
Cherry has described herself as polyamorous. In February 2023, she was charged with a misdemeanor count for retail theft in Lancaster, Pennsylvania after being accused of stealing a US$28 blouse from a Lancaster shopping complex in December 2022.

References

External links 
 Official website
 Chloe Cherry on Instagram
 Chloe Cherry on IMDb

1997 births
Living people
21st-century American actresses
Actresses from Pennsylvania
American pornographic film actresses
American television actresses
Female models from Pennsylvania
People from Lancaster, Pennsylvania
Polyamorous people